The FL lines, formerly Lazio regional railways (also Ferrovie Laziali) consist of 8 commuter rail lines operated by Trenitalia, converging on the city of Rome.

Lines FL1, FL2 and FL3, particularly in areas closer to Rome, function like a rapid transit service, integrated with the Rome Metro and surface transportation.  The other lines (numbered from FL4 to FL8) are served by traditional regional trains, and used almost exclusively for commuter traffic.

All eight lines are considered regional trains by Trenitalia. On timetables and departure boards at the stations the trains are marked with the letter R (Regional).
The numbering of the lines (FL1, FL2, ...) appears only in some informational materials and on the signs of some stations.
However, in the ATAC network, the numbering appears in all network maps.

Lines
 FL1 Orte ↔ Fiumicino Aeroporto
 FL2 Roma Tiburtina ↔ 
 FL3 Roma Ostiense ↔ Viterbo Porta Fiorentina
 FL4 Roma Termini ↔ Frascati / Albano Laziale / Velletri
 FL5 Roma Termini ↔ Civitavecchia
 FL6 Roma Termini ↔ Cassino
 FL7 Roma Termini ↔ Minturno-Scauri
 FL8 Roma Termini ↔ Nettuno

Frequencies
Sections with one train every 15 minutes:

 Fiumicino Aeroporto - Fara Sabina (line FL1)
 Roma Ostiense - Cesano di Roma (line FL3)

Sections with one train every 30 minutes:

 Fara Sabina - Poggio Mirteto (line FL1)
 Roma Tiburtina - Lunghezza (line FL2)
 Cesano - Bracciano (line FL3)
 Roma Termini - Civitavecchia (line FL5)

Sections with one train every 60 minutes:

 Poggio Mirteto - Orte (line FL1)
 Lunghezza - Tivoli (line FL2)
 Bracciano - Viterbo Porta Fiorentina (line FL3)

Fares
For travel between stations in the City of Rome, ticketing is integrated with the Metrebus Rome system.  A passenger may use the integrated ticket "BIT" from 1,50€ (valid for 100 minutes) or any other type of integrated ticket or Metrebus pass; in addition, Trenitalia sells special "Anello" tickets where one may travel on any Trenitalia train within the City of Rome with a single 1€ ticket (valid for 90 minutes).  The "Anello" and the Metrebus Rome tickets are only valid within Rome, bounded by the stations: Capannelle (FL4 and FL6), Cesano di Roma (FL3), Fiera di Roma (FL1), Lunghezza (FL2), Roma Aurelia (FL5), Settebagni (FL1) and Torricola (FL7 and FL8).

For all trips that take place outside the "Anello" ring, or that cross through the ring, the typical regional mileage rate applies.

Network map

See also

History of rail transport in Italy
List of railway stations in Lazio
Rail transport in Italy
Transport in Rome
Rome–Lido railway

Rome–Civita Castellana–Viterbo railway

Bibliography

External links

.
Railway lines in Lazio
Rapid transit in Italy
Ferrovie regionali del Lazio Lines
Ferrovie regionali del Lazio Lines